

K

References

Lists of words